CPR-Kontoret, is the Danish government agency that houses Det Centrale Personregister. It was established in 1968.

Among other things, it is responsible for ensuring that every person registered as a citizen of Denmark receives a personal identification number.

It is a department of "3. Økonomiske kontor" (3rd Economic Office), which itself is a department of the Ministry of Health and Prevention.

Government agencies of Denmark